Penelope Jane Taylor (born 24 May 1981) is an Australian retired professional basketball player and assistant coach. During her 19-year career, Taylor spent the most time with the Phoenix Mercury of the WNBA, where she won three championships. She also won the WNBL title with her first club, the Australian Institute of Sport, and played in China, Italy, Turkey and Russia. As part of the Australian woman's national team, Taylor won two Olympic medals and led the Australian Opals to a gold medal at the World Championships, winning tournament MVP honours ahead of teammate Lauren Jackson.

Early life
Penny Taylor was born in Melbourne, Victoria to English parents Michael Taylor and Denna Noble. She has a younger brother named Phillip, step-sister Abbey and an older sister named Heather. Her parents enrolled Taylor in the Belgrave South Red Devils basketball club at the age of 4. The camaraderie helped Taylor overcome her shyness, and eventually move to the Nunawading Spectres. She attended Upwey High School in Upwey, Victoria, and after graduating earned a scholarship to the Australian Institute of Sport in Canberra.

Taylor holds a UK passport due to her parents' origin.

WNBL career
Taylor debuted in the Women's National Basketball League playing for the AIS (Australian Institute of Sport) starting in 1997–98, winning the WNBL title the following season. Afterwards she moved to Dandenong Rangers, where she remained from 1999 to 2002.  Taylor led the league in scoring with 25.5 points per game and steals with 2.5 steals per game during the 2000–01 season, being named the WNBL MVP in that season and the next.

After 12 years away from the Australian league, Taylor signed with the Rangers for the 2014–15 WNBL season. Her main intention for the return was to stay close to her family, playing in front of her nephews while also tending for her cancer-ridden father. She scored 20.2 points a game from 17 matches in qualifying the Rangers for the playoffs. During the semifinals against the Sydney Uni Flames, the Rangers were 15 points ahead when Taylor injured her ankle with eight minutes remaining, and her absence was enough for Sydney to take over and win the game.

WNBA career
Taylor was selected by the Cleveland Rockers in the first round (11th overall) during the annual WNBA Draft on 20 April 2001.  She starred for the Rockers for three seasons.

In January 2004, the WNBA held a dispersal draft, where the league's existing teams selected former players from the Rockers team.  Taylor was selected as the first overall pick by the Phoenix Mercury.

In July 2007 she was chosen as a reserve for the WNBA All Star game. On 16 September 2007, Penny Taylor along with Diana Taurasi and Cappie Pondexter led the Phoenix Mercury to the WNBA championship defeating the Detroit Shock in the final game 5 of the finals, 108 – 92, they became the first team to end out a finals series at an away venue in the WNBA.

Taylor sat out most of the 2009 season after having ankle surgery that required nine weeks of recovery, but returned to the Mercury mid-season and averaged 10.7 points off the bench. The Mercury went on to win the WNBA Championship that year, beating the Indiana Fever 3 games to 2, with Taylor making 2 clutch free throws down the stretch to help clinch the decisive game 94–86.

In 2012, Taylor suffered an anterior cruciate ligament injury of her left knee playing in Turkey during the WNBA offseason, and was forced to sit out of the Mercury's season. Her year-long recovery in Australia had Taylor going through three knee operations, including one to remove floating cartilage revealed in a magnetic resonance imaging exam, and seeing her mother die of cancer. Taylor's return to the Mercury in 2013 eventually had her other knee give in after six games, leading her to further surgery.
 
Taylor spent the 2014 pre-season working with both the Mercury and the Phoenix Suns health staff to make sure her return to basketball worked. Under new coach and former Australia teammate Sandy Brondello, Taylor saw limited minutes during the first eleven games of the 2014 WNBA season. Once Brondello saw her recovered enough, Taylor returned as a Mercury starter, and the team would then go on to win the following 16 games, the longest win streak in WNBA history and not lose again at home for the remainder of the 2014 season. Taylor's return helped lead the team to the best result in the Western Conference with an average of 10.5 points a game for 33 games, as well as the best record in league history with 29 wins and 5 losses, only one of whom had Taylor as a starter. The Mercury returned to the WNBA Finals, winning the title against the Chicago Sky. An unsigned free agent in 2015, she decided to sit out the 2015 season for personal reasons after the loss of her father. The Mercury re-signed her on 8 February 2016, and Taylor was present right at the first game to start her thirteenth season at the WNBA. Prior to the August break for the Olympics, Taylor announced she would retire at the end of the season. Her last career game happened on 2 October in Phoenix, as the Mercury were swept by the Minnesota Lynx in the WNBA semifinals.

International basketball

Taylor has been a regular member of the Australian national team, the 'Opals', since 2002, when won a bronze medal in the 2002 World Championship. Her biggest accomplishment was winning the 2006 World Championship in Brazil, where Taylor was named Most Valuable Player of the championship. They won silver medals in consecutive Olympiads: Athens 2004 and Beijing 2008. She wound up out of the Opals for the 2012 Summer Olympics after injuring herself playing in Turkey for Fenerbahçe. Taylor was named Australian Opals captain for the 2014 World Championship, helping the team win the bronze medal, and was named to the All-Star Five. Her last tournament with the Opals was at Rio 2016, where Australia fell in the quarterfinals.

During the WNBA offseason, Taylor has played in Italy, Russia and Turkey, winning each league at least once. The 2015-16 offseason had Taylor in the Shanxi Flame of the Women's Chinese Basketball Association, averaging 23.9 points, 7.1 rebounds and 4.2 assists.

Coaching career
In March 2017, Taylor became the Director of Player Development and Performance for her former WNBA team, the Phoenix Mercury. After giving birth to a son in March 2018, Taylor took a year off from coaching. In April 2019, the Mercury announced that Taylor had been hired as an assistant coach. As of September 2019, Taylor's spouse, Diana Taurasi, is a player for the Phoenix Mercury. It was announced on 6 July 2020 that Taylor would step down as assistant coach of the Mercury to focus on being a full-time mother.

Personal life
Taylor was married in 2005 to Brazilian volleyball player Rodrigo Rodrigues Gil, but they later divorced. On 13 May 2017, she married fellow Phoenix Mercury star Diana Taurasi. On 1 March 2018, the couple welcomed their first child when Taylor gave birth to their son Leo Michael Taurasi-Taylor. On 26 July 2021, it was announced Taylor was pregnant with their second child, due in October. On 9 October 2021, Taylor gave birth to their first daughter, Isla Taurasi-Taylor, with Taurasi by her side mere hours after Taurasi played the Las Vegas Aces in Las Vegas for game five of the 2021 WNBA Semifinals.

WNBA career statistics

WNBA regular season

|-
| align="left" | 2001
| align="left" | Cleveland
| 32 || 0 || 17.5 || .382 || .301 || .783 || 3.5 || 1.4 || 1.0 || 0.3 || 1.1 || 7.2
|-
| align="left" | 2002
| align="left" | Cleveland
| 30 || 26 || 30.3 || .416 || .342 || .853 || 5.3 || 2.3 || 1.2 || 0.3 || 1.9 || 13.0
|-
| align="left" | 2003
| align="left" | Cleveland
| 34 || 33 || 26.4 || .421 || .343 || .821 || 4.4 || 2.4 || 1.1 || 0.2 || 1.7 || 11.7
|-
| align="left" | 2004
| align="left" | Phoenix
| 33 || 33 || 32.6 || .484 || .427 || .861 || 4.8 || 2.5 || 1.5 || 0.4 || 2.4 || 13.2
|-
| align="left" | 2005
| align="left" | Phoenix
| 29 || 29 || 29.4 || .464 || .404 || .864 || 4.1 || 3.2 || 1.3 || 0.3 || 2.6 || 13.2
|-
| align="left" | 2006
| align="left" | Phoenix
| 20 || 8 || 26.8 || .445 || .369 || .864 || 5.7 || 2.6 || 1.4 || 0.4 || 1.4 || 13.9
|-
|style="text-align:left;background:#afe6ba;"| 2007†
| align="left" | Phoenix
| 34 || 34 || 29.7 || .499 || .378 || .884 || 6.3 || 2.9 || 1.5 || 0.6 || 2.2 || 17.8
|-
|style="text-align:left;background:#afe6ba;"|2009†
| align="left" | Phoenix
| 14 || 1 || 20.2 || .463 || .400 || .896 || 2.4 || 2.3 || 1.2 || 0.1 || 2.2 || 10.9
|-
| align="left" | 2010
| align="left" | Phoenix
| 32 || 32|| 30.0 || .509 || .442 || .893 || 4.4 || 5.0 || 1.4 || 0.2 || 2.3 || 15.9
|-
| align="left" | 2011
| align="left" | Phoenix
| 29 || 29 || 29.8 || .511 || .402 || .874 ||4.9 || 4.7 || 1.6 || 0.3 || 2.2 || 16.7
|-
| align="left" | 2013
| align="left" | Phoenix
| 10 || 3 || 16.1 || .472 || .421 || .963 || 2.1 || 1.7 || 0.8 || 0.1 ||0.6 || 8.4
|-
|style="text-align:left;background:#afe6ba;"| 2014†
| align="left" | Phoenix
| 33 || 24 || 23.4 || .479 || .357 || .848 || 3.1 || 3.1 || 1.2 || 0.4 || 1.7 || 10.5
|-
| align="left" | 2016
| align="left" | Phoenix
| 25 || 25 || 25.7 || .488 || .396 || .907 || 3.8 || 3.6 || 1.5 || 0.4 || 1.6 || 12.5
|-style="background:#87CEEB"
| align="left" | Career
|
| 355 || 277 || 26.8 || .466 || .382 || .868  || 4.4 || 3.0 || 1.4 || 0.3 || 2.0 || 13.0
|}

WNBA Postseason

|-
| align="left" | 2001
| align="left" | Cleveland
| 3 || 0 || 19.7 || .320 || .182 || .750 || 3.0 || 1.0 || 2.0 || 0.3 || 1.6 || 7.0
|-
| align="left" | 2003
| align="left" | Cleveland
| 3 || 3 || 33.0 || .444  || .300 || .833 || 4.3 || 1.0 || 2.0 || 0.3 || 2.0 || 15.0
|-
|style="text-align:left;background:#afe6ba;"| 2007†
| align="left" | Phoenix
| 9 || 9 || 34.6 || .464 || .400 || .912 || 7.9 || 3.8 || 1.7 || 1.1 || 2.7 || 19.3
|-
|style="text-align:left;background:#afe6ba;"| 2009†
| align="left" | Phoenix
| 11 || 0 || 24.1 || .527 || .484 || .863 || 3.5 || 3.4 || 0.3 || 0.1 || 1.0 || 14.3
|-
| align="left" | 2010
| align="left" | Phoenix
| 4 || 4 || 31.8 || .474 || .556 || .882 || 4.8 || 6.8 || 2.0 || 0.5 || 2.2 || 14.0
|-
| align="left" | 2011
| align="left" | Phoenix
| 5 || 5 || 30.8 || .478 || .308 || .833 || 5.2 || 3.0 || 0.8 || 0.2 || 1.8 || 11.6
|-
| align="left" | 2013
| align="left" | Phoenix
| 2 || 2 || 20.0 || .500 || .333 || .500 || 2.0 || 4.0 || 1.0 || 0.0 || 1.0 || 6.0
|-
|style="text-align:left;background:#afe6ba;"| 2014†
| align="left" | Phoenix
| 8 || 8 || 27.7 || .492 || .263  || .903 || 5.1 || 4.9 || 1.7 || 0.3 || 1.1 || 11.4
|-
| align="left" | 2016
| align="left" | Phoenix
| 5 || 5 || 26.1 || .368  || .313 || .958 || 4.4 || 3.0 || 1.6 || 0.8 || 1.8 || 11.2
|-style="background:#87CEEB"
| align="left" | Career
|
| 50 || 36 || 28.1 || .466 || .364 || .887  || 4.9 || 3.6 || 1.4 || 0.5 || 1.7 || 13.4
|}

See also
 List of Australian WNBA players

References

External links
WNBA Player Profile
fenerbahce.org Profile

1981 births
Living people
Australian expatriate basketball people in China
Australian expatriate basketball people in Italy
Australian expatriate basketball people in Russia
Australian expatriate basketball people in Turkey
Australian expatriate basketball people in the United States
Australian Institute of Sport basketball (WNBL) players
Australian people of English descent
Australian women's basketball players
Basketball players at the 2004 Summer Olympics
Basketball players at the 2008 Summer Olympics
Basketball players at the 2016 Summer Olympics
Cleveland Rockers players
Dandenong Rangers players
Fenerbahçe women's basketball players
Lesbian sportswomen
LGBT basketball players
Australian LGBT sportspeople
Medalists at the 2004 Summer Olympics
Medalists at the 2008 Summer Olympics
Olympic basketball players of Australia
Olympic medalists in basketball
Olympic silver medalists for Australia
Phoenix Mercury players
Shanxi Flame players
Basketball players from Melbourne
Women's National Basketball Association All-Stars
Forwards (basketball)
Sportswomen from Victoria (Australia)